World Jazz is the sixth album released by the flamenco-influenced Latin guitar instrumental duo Lara & Reyes.  This album was nominated for a Latin Grammy in 2001 in the category of Best Instrumental Pop Album.

Track listing
"Leona"  – 6:11
"Nuevo Mundo"  – 5:23
"Sandia Fresca"  – 6:55
"Danielle's Waltz"  – 4:44
"Los Flamingos"  – 5:25
"Que Boquita"  – 6:04
"Amor de Lejos"  – 5:19
"10 to 6"  – 4:27
"Neila"  – 7:44
"La Barranca"  – 3:07

References

2000 albums
Lara & Reyes albums
Higher Octave albums